Abbot of Bury St. Edmunds was the title used by the head of the Benedictine monastery Bury St. Edmunds Abbey in the county of Suffolk, England. The following table lists the abbots from the foundation of the abbey in 1020 until its dissolution in 1539.

On 4 November 1539, the abbey was surrendered. The surrender is signed by Abbot John Reeve, Prior Thomas Ringstede (alias Dennis), and by forty-two other monks. All were awarded pensions, of varying amounts.

Notes

References

Abbots of Bury St. Edmunds
Benedictine abbots by monastery